The Mary Pickford Award is an honorary Satellite Award bestowed by the International Press Academy. It is "IPA's most prestigious honor" and as an award "for Outstanding Artistic Contribution to the Entertainment Industry" it reflects a lifetime of achievement.

The award is named for Mary Pickford, early pioneer of the film industry, who began her career as a child actress and went on to become "America's Sweetheart" and a co-founder of United Artists Studios with fellow filmmakers Charlie Chaplin, Douglas Fairbanks and D. W. Griffith.

The award was first presented to Rod Steiger at the 1st Golden Satellite Awards. Tom Skerritt is the latest recipient.

The trophy awarded to the honorees is a bust of Canadian American motion picture actress Mary Pickford cast in bronze, on a marble base, inscribed for the recipient. It was designed by Sarajevan sculptor Dragan Radenović.

Honorees

 1996: Rod Steiger
 1997: Jodie Foster
 1998: Alan J. Pakula
 1999: Maximilian Schell
 2000: Francis Ford Coppola
 2001: Karl Malden
 2002: Robert Evans
 2003: Arnon Milchan
 2004: Susan Sarandon
 2005: Gena Rowlands
 2006: Martin Landau
 2007: Kathy Bates
 2008: Louis Gossett Jr.
 2009: Michael York
 2010: Vanessa Williams
 2011: Mitzi Gaynor
 2012: Terence Stamp
 2013: Mike Medavoy
 2014: Ellen Burstyn
 2015: Louise Fletcher
 2016: Edward James Olmos
 2017: Dabney Coleman
 2018: Rade Šerbedžija
 2019: Stacy Keach
 2020: Tilda Swinton
 2021: Tom Skerritt

References

External links
 International Press Academy website

Mary Pickford
Awards established in 1997